Fortyfive Co. Ltd. is a Japanese software development company known for its Tokyo Bus Guide and other SEGA Dreamcast games. Prior to 1997, the studio was known as AIM.

Games as AIM
Armadillo, Famicom/NES
Lodoss Tou Senki 
Honoo no Doukyuuji: Dodge Danpei, PC Engine
Fausseté Amour, PC Engine CD
Crayon Shin-chan: Nagagutsu Dobon!!, Super Famicom
Doraemon 3: Nobita to Toki no Hougyoku, Super Famicom
Inspector Gadget, Super NES
Lord Monarch, Super Famicom
Shōnin yo Taishi wo Idake!!, Super Famicom
SWAT Kats: The Radical Squadron, Super NES

Games as Fortyfive
Communication Logic Battle Daisessen (通信対戦ロジックバトル 大雪戦)
Hello Kitty: Garden Panic
July (ジュライ)
Tokyo Bus Guide (東京バス案内)
Tokyo Bus Guide Bijin Bus Guide Tenjou Pack (aka Tokyo Bus Guide: Featuring a Beautiful Bus Tour Conductor) (東京バス案内美人バスガイド添乗パック)
Weakness Hero Torauman (ウィークネスヒーロー トラウマン)

Related Lists
List of Dreamcast Games

References

Video game companies of Japan
Video game development companies